is a railway station in the city of Matsumoto, Nagano, Japan, operated by the private railway operating company Alpico Kōtsū.

Lines
Nishi-Matsumoto Station is a station on the Kamikōchi Line and is 0.4 kilometers from the terminus of the line at Matsumoto Station.

Station layout
The station has one ground-level side platform serving a single bi-directional track. The station is unattended.

Adjacent stations

History
The station opened on 1 May 1927.

Passenger statistics
In fiscal 2016, the station was used by an average of 201 passengers daily (boarding passengers only).

Surrounding area
Matsumoto Kyoritsu Hospital

See also
 List of railway stations in Japan

References

External links
 

Railway stations in Japan opened in 1927
Railway stations in Matsumoto City
Kamikōchi Line